Berckheyde is a surname. Notable people with the surname include:

 Gerrit Berckheyde (1638–1698), Dutch painter
 Job Adriaenszoon Berckheyde (1630–1693), Dutch painter, brother of Gerrit